Mount Tavkvetili is a volcanic mountain in the northern part of the Abul-Samsari Range in the Samtskhe-Javakheti region of Southern Georgia. It is also known as Gora Tavk'vetili and Mta Tavk'vetili. The mountain has the shape of a decapitated cone and is composed of young andesitic and andesitic-dacitic lavas. The lower slopes of Mount Tavkvetili are covered by subalpine meadows while the upper slopes are covered by alpine meadows.

Natural disasters 
Mount Tavkvetili has destructive earthquakes around once every 50 years that rank over a 7 on the Richter magnitude scale.

References
 Georgian State (Soviet) Encyclopedia. 1979. Book 4. p. 569.

Mountains of Georgia (country)
Volcanoes of Georgia (country)
Mountains of Samtskhe-Javakheti region